This is a list of drivers to have competed in the FIA European Rally Championship since 1953 and between 2007 and 2011, the period when drivers had to register for the championship until it merged with the Intercontinental Rally Challenge.

Drivers in bold have competed in this year's season, the 2018 season.

All ERC drivers

See also
List of World Rally Championship drivers

European Rally Championship drivers